Lorenzo Valla (also Latinized as Laurentius;  14071 August 1457) was an Italian Renaissance humanist, rhetorician, educator, scholar, and Catholic priest. He is best known for his historical-critical textual analysis that proved that the Donation of Constantine was a forgery, therefore attacking and undermining the presumption of temporal power claimed by the papacy. Lorenzo is sometimes seen as a precursor of the Reformation.

Life 
Valla was born in Rome, with a family background of Piacenza; his father, Luciave della Valla, was a lawyer who worked in the Papal Curia. He was educated in Rome, attending the classes of teachers including Leonardo Bruni and Giovanni Aurispa, from whom he learned Latin and Greek. He is thought otherwise to have been largely self-taught.

Bruni was a papal secretary; Melchior Scrivani, Valla's uncle, was another. But Valla had caused offence, to Antonio Loschi, by championing the rhetorician Quintilian in an early work. In 1431, Valla entered the priesthood and tried in vain to secure a position as apostolic secretary. He was unsuccessful, despite his network of contacts.

Valla went to Piacenza, and then to Pavia, where he obtained a professorship of eloquence. His tenure at Pavia was made uncomfortable by his attack on the Latin style of the jurist Bartolus de Saxoferrato. He became itinerant, moving from one university to another, accepting short engagements and lecturing in many cities.

Invited to Rome by Pope Nicholas V, Pope from 1447 to 1455, and the founder of the Vatican Library, Valla worked there on his Repastinatio.

Valla died in Rome.

Reputation
Older biographies of Valla give details of many literary and theological disputes, the most prominent one with Gianfrancesco Poggio Bracciolini, which took place after his settlement in Rome. Extreme language was employed. He appears as quarrelsome, combining humanistic elegance with critical wit and venom, and an opponent of the temporal power of the Catholic Church.

Luther had a high opinion of Valla and of his writings, and Robert Bellarmine called him "Luther's precursor".  Erasmus stated in his De ratione studii that for Latin grammar, there was "no better guide than Lorenzo Valla."

Works

On the Donation of Constantine 
Between 1439 and 1440 Valla wrote the essay, De falso credita et ementita Constantini Donatione declamatio, which analyzed the document usually known as the Donation of Constantine. The Donation suggests that Constantine I gave the whole of the Western Roman Empire to the Roman Catholic Church. This was supposedly an act of gratitude for having been miraculously cured of leprosy by Pope Sylvester I.

From 1435 to 1445, Valla was employed in the court of Alfonso V of Aragon, who became involved in a territorial conflict with the Papal States, then under Pope Eugene IV. This relationship possibly motivated his work; in any case, he was put on trial before the Catholic Inquisition in 1444, but was protected from imprisonment by the intervention of Alfonso V.

Valla demonstrated that the internal evidence in the Donation told against a 4th-century origin: its vernacular style could be dated to the 8th century. Valla argued this thesis in three ways:

 By stating that the Emperor Constantine could not have legally given Pope Sylvester the powers that the Donation claimed.
 From the absence of contemporary evidence, Valla reasoned that it was implausible that a major change in the administration of the Western Roman Empire had taken place.
 Valla doubted that Emperor Constantine had gifted Pope Sylvester anything at all, suggesting a mistake involving an earlier Pope.

Supplementing these points, Valla argued from anachronism: the document contained the word satrap, which he believed Romans such as Constantine I would not have used. In addition, Valla believes that the quality of Latin for such a supposedly important text was undeniably poor, evidencing this by the fact that the text constantly switched tenses from "we have proclaimed" to "we decree", for instance.

Textual criticism
A specialist in Latin translation, Valla made numerous suggestions for improving on Petrarch's study of Livy. The emendation of Livy was also a topic discussed in book IV of his Antidotum in Facium, an invective against Bartolomeo Facio. In this part of the treatise, which also circulated independently under the title Emendationes in T. Livium, Valla elucidates numerous corrupt passages and criticises the attempts at emendation made by Panormita and Facio, his rivals at the court of Alfonso V.

In his critical study of the official Bible used by the Roman Catholic Church, Jerome's Latin Vulgate, Valla called into question the church's system of penance and indulgences. He argued that the practice of penance rested on Jerome's use of the Latin word paenitenia (penance) for the Greek metanoia, which he believed would have been more accurately translated as "repentance."  Valla's work was praised by later critics of the Church's penance and indulgence system, including Erasmus.

Manuscript works
Valla made a contemporary reputation with two works: his dialogue De Voluptate and his treatise De Elegantiis Latinae Linguae. Richard Claverhouse Jebb said that his De Elegantiis "marked the highest level that had yet been reached in the critical study of Latin."

Printed editions
Collected editions of Valla's works, not quite complete, were published at Basel in 1540 and at Venice in 1592, and Elegantiae linguae Latinae was reprinted nearly sixty times between 1471 and 1536.

 Opera omnia, Basel 1540; reprinted with a second volume (Turin: Bottega d'Erasmo, 1962).
 Repastinatio dialectice et philosophie, ed. G. Zippel, 2 vols. (First critical edition of the three versions: Padua: Antenore, 1982).
 Elegantiae linguae Latinae, Venice 1471, edited by S. López Moreda (Cáceres: Universidad de Extremadura, 1999).
 De vero falsoque bono, edited by M. de Panizza Lorch, Bari, 1970.
 Collatio Novi Testamenti, edited by A. Perosa (Florence: Sansoni, 1970).
 De falso credita et ementita Constantini donatione, ed. W. Setz (Weimar: Hermann Böhlaus Nachfolger, 1976; reprinted Leipzig: Teubner, 1994).
 Ars Grammatica, ed. P. Casciano with Italian translation (Milan: Mondadori, Fondazione Lorenzo Valla, 1990).
 On the Donation of Constantine. The I Tatti Renaissance Library (Cambridge, Massachusetts: Harvard University Press, 2007).
 Dialectical Disputations. The I Tatti Renaissance Library (Cambridge: Harvard University Press, London, 2012).
 Correspondence, ed. Cook, Brendan. The I Tatti Renaissance Library (Cambridge, Massachusetts: Harvard University Press, 2013).

English translations
 On the donation of Constantine translated by G. W. Bowersock, Cambridge, Massachusetts: Harvard University Press, 2008.
 Dialogue on Free Will, translated by C. Trinkaus. In: 'The Renaissance Philosophy of Man', edited by Ernst Cassirer et al., Chicago: University of Chicago Press, 1948.
 The profession of the religious and selections from The falsely-believed and forged donation of Constantine translated, and with an introduction and notes, by Olga Zorzi Pugliese, Toronto: Centre for Reformation and Renaissance Studies, 1998.
 De vero falsoque bono translated by A. K. Hieatt and M. Lorch, New York: Abaris Books 1977.
 In Praise of Saint Thomas Aquinas, translated by M. E. Hanley. In Renaissance Philosophy, ed. L. A. Kennedy, Mouton: The Hague, 1973.
 Dialectical Disputations, Latin text and English translation of the Repastinatio by B. P. Copenhaver and L. Nauta, Harvard University Press, 2012 (I Tatti Renaissance Library, two volumes).

Notes

Further reading
For detailed accounts of Valla's life and work see:
 G. Voigt, Die Wiederbelebung des classischen Alterthums (1880–81);
 John Addington Symonds, Renaissance in Italy (1897–99);
 G. Mancini, Vita di Lorenzo Valla (Florence, 1891);
 M. von Wolff, Lorenzo Valla (Leipzig, 1893);
 Jakob Burckhardt, Kultur der Renaissance (1860);
 J. Vahlen, Laurentius Valla (Berlin, 1870); L Pastor, Geschichte der Päpste, Band ii. English trans. by FI Antrobus (1892);
 The article in Herzog-Hauck's Realencyklopädie, Band xx. (Leipzig, 1908).
 John Edwin Sandys, Hist. of Class. Schol. ii. (1908), pp. 66‑70.
 Lisa Jardine, "Lorenzo Valla and the Intellectual Origins of Humanist Dialectic," Journal of the History of Philosophy 15 (1977): 143–64.
 Maristella de Panizza Lorch, A defense of life: Lorenzo Valla's theory of pleasure., Humanistische Bibliothek 1/36, Munich: Wilhelm Fink, 1985, 
 Peter Mack, Renaissance Argument: Valla and Agricola in the Traditions of Rhetoric and Dialectic, Leiden ; New York : E.J. Brill, 1993.
 Paul Richard Blum, "Lorenzo Valla - Humanism as Philosophy", Philosophers of the Renaissance, Washington 2010, 33–42. 
 Matthew DeCoursey, "Continental European Rhetoricians, 1400-1600, and Their Influence in Renaissance England," British Rhetoricians and Logicians, 1500-1660, First Series, DLB 236, Detroit: Gale, 2001, pp. 309–343.
 Melissa Meriam Bullard, "The Renaissance Project of Knowing: Lorenzo Valla and Salvatore Camporeale's Contributions to the Querelle Between Rhetoric and Philosophy," Journal of the History of Ideas 66.4 (2005): 477–81.
 Brian P. Copenhaver, "Valla Our Contemporary: Philosophy and Philology," Journal of the History of Ideas 66.4 (2005): 507–25.
 Christopher S. Celenza, "Lorenzo Valla and the Traditions and Transmissions of Philosophy,” Journal of the History of Ideas 66 (2005): 483–506.
 Lodi Nauta, In Defense of Common Sense: Lorenzo Valla's Humanist Critique of Scholastic Philosophy, Cambridge, Massachusetts : Harvard University Press, 2009.
 Marsico, Clementina. "Radical reform, inevitable debts: Lorenzo Valla, Alexander de Villa-Dei, and recent grammarians." Historiographia Linguistica 44, no. 2-3 (2017): 391-411.
 Marsico, Clementina. "Su quia nelle Elegantie di Lorenzo Valla e nel latino umanistico." Su quia nelle Elegantie di Lorenzo Valla e nel latino umanistico (2020): 27-42.
 Magnani, Nicolò. 2020. "Aristotelismo e metricologia nel De poetica di Giorgio Valla."  . Studi e problemi di critica testuale : 100, 1, 173-197.
 Blanchard, W. Scott. "The negative dialectic of Lorenzo Valla: a study in the pathology of opposition." Renaissance Studies 14, no. 2 (2000): 149-189.

External links
 Lorenzo Valla, Discourse on the Forgery of the Alleged Donation of Constantine
 Lorenzo Valla: Elegantiarum Laurentii Vallae. Naples (c. 1473). At Somni
 Tomb of Lorenzo Valla

Attribution

1400s births
1457 deaths
15th-century Italian writers
15th-century Italian Roman Catholic priests
15th-century Latin writers
Christian humanists
Critics of the Catholic Church
Italian Renaissance humanists
Italian Renaissance writers
Italian rhetoricians
Italian Roman Catholic writers
Proto-Protestants
Writers from Rome
Year of birth uncertain